Loop Loop was a small unincorporated community in Okanogan County, Washington, United States. According to the Geographic Names Information System, this is French for 'wolf wolf'. It was also known as Loup Loup.

See also 
 List of reduplicated place names

References 

Unincorporated communities in Washington (state)
Unincorporated communities in Okanogan County, Washington
Populated places in the Okanagan Country